Georg Wellhöfer (16 March 1893 – 13 December 1968) was a German international footballer.

References

1893 births
1968 deaths
Sportspeople from Fürth
Footballers from Bavaria
Association football defenders
German footballers
Germany international footballers
1. FC Saarbrücken managers
German football managers